Ivan Nagaev (born 3 July 1990) is an Uzbekistani professional footballer who currently plays for FC Sogdiana Jizzakh as a forward.

Career
Ivan Nagaev signed a contract with Bunyodkor and on 24 February 2011 he was officially announced as a Bunyodkor player for Season 2011. In 2011, he was loaned to Metallurg Bekabad and during the second half of the season played for FK Dinamo Samarqand.

In 2012 season he played 22 matches for Dinamo, scoring 7 goals. On 13 December 2012 he moved to Lokomotiv Tashkent. Playing for Lokomotiv in 2013 season, he became 3rd best goalscorer of the club.

International
Nagaev played for Uzbekistan at the 2009 FIFA U-20 World Cup finals in Egypt. He scored one goal against England which was draw 1:1 in the end.

Honours
Lokomotiv
Uzbek League runner-up: 2013
Uzbekistan Supercup runner-up: 2013

References

External links 

 
 Ivan Nagaev - Instagram

1989 births
Living people
Uzbekistani footballers
Uzbekistani expatriate footballers
Uzbekistani people of Russian descent
Place of birth missing (living people)
FK Dinamo Samarqand players
Navbahor Namangan players
FC Bunyodkor players
PFC Lokomotiv Tashkent players
Qadsia SC players
Buxoro FK players
FC Ordabasy players
Uzbekistan Super League players
Kazakhstan Premier League players
Footballers at the 2010 Asian Games
Association football forwards
Asian Games competitors for Uzbekistan
Uzbekistani expatriate sportspeople in Kazakhstan
Expatriate footballers in Kazakhstan
Uzbekistan international footballers
Kuwait Premier League players
Uzbekistani expatriate sportspeople in Kuwait
Expatriate footballers in Kuwait
FC Sogdiana Jizzakh players
FC Qizilqum Zarafshon players
PFK Metallurg Bekabad players